Church House in Belfast, Northern Ireland is the headquarters of the Presbyterian Church in Ireland. Although there was a decision taken to move to a new location the General Assembly, in 2005, voted to overturn the decision. Since the refurbishment, in 1992, Church House is now open for functions as a commercial conference centre.

Location 

The building is located near the centre of Belfast at the junction of Fisherwick Place, Great Victoria Street, Howard Street and Grosvenor Road. It was built in 1905, in the Gothic style, and opened by the Duke of Argyll. Church House is dominated by a 40m high clock tower, which contains Belfast's only peal of 12 bells.

Church House is home to the General Assembly of the Presbyterian Church in Ireland. The Assembly Hall is oval shaped with gallery, it can seat 1,300 people. The hall is illuminated by a glass skylight, which is now illuminated artificially.

The Spires 

Following its refurbishment in 1992 Church House also functions as a commercial conference centre, The Spires. The city centre location close to major hotels makes it an ideal conference location. In recent years it has hosted such major events as the International Housing Conference, Tom Peters Business Seminar and the European Union Women's Conference, May 1998.

External links
The Presbyterian Church in Ireland homepage
The Spires homepage

Presbyterian Church in Ireland
Buildings and structures in Belfast
Denomination headquarters in the United Kingdom
Grade B1 listed buildings
Presbyterianism in the United Kingdom